Allenella formalis, also known as the brown turban pinhead snail, is a species of land snail that is endemic to Australia's Lord Howe Island in the Tasman Sea.

Description
The globosely turbinate shell of the mature snail is 2.5–2.6 mm in height, with a diameter of 3.4–3.6 mm, and a moderately raised conical spire. It is amber to dark brown in colour. The whorls are rounded above and below a slightly angular periphery, with impressed sutures and closely spaced radial ribs. It has an ovately lunate aperture and narrowly open umbilicus. The animal is dark brown with a paler brown sole.

Distribution and habitat
The snail occurs on the summits and upper slopes of the island's southern mountains.

References

 
 

 
formalis
Gastropods of Lord Howe Island
Taxa named by Tom Iredale
Gastropods described in 1944